Cantatore is a surname. Notable people with the surname include:

 Domenico Cantatore (1906–1998), Italian painter, mosaic artist, and illustrator
 Eugenio Cantatore, Italian electrical engineer
 Vicente Cantatore (1935–2021), Argentine football player and manager

Italian-language surnames